Long Eaton is a town in the Erewash district of Derbyshire, England, just north of the River Trent, about  south-west of Nottingham and some 8½ miles (13.7 km) south-east of Derby. The town population was 37,760 at the 2011 census. It has been part of Erewash borough since 1 April 1974, when Long Eaton Urban District was disbanded.

Geography
Long Eaton lies in Derbyshire, across the border of Nottinghamshire and close to Leicestershire. It is covered by the Nottingham post town and has a Nottingham telephone area code (0115). Long Eaton sits on the banks of the River Trent

History
Long Eaton is referred to as Aitone, in the Domesday Book. Several origins have been suggested, for example "farm between streams" and "low-lying land". It was a farming settlement that grew up close to the lowest bridging point of the River Erewash.

The "Great Fire" of Long Eaton in 1694 destroyed 14 houses and several other buildings in the market place.

The village remained a stable size until the construction of the Midland Counties Railway in 1839 and the Erewash Valley Line in 1844, which brought links that encouraged growth. Two industries came to employ many people in the growing town: lace-making and railway wagon manufacturing. A large railway yard at Toton Sidings grew up just north of the town.

By 1900 the town population exceeded 10,000, after construction of housing, offices and factories through the Victorian period. In 1921 its extent was broadened to include Wilsthorpe and parts of Sandiacre and Sawley.

Notable architecture

One notable building is the Palladian Long Eaton Town Hall. Originally a private house, it is now owned by the borough council and forms part of the expanded offices of Erewash Borough Council, which opened in 1991.

The Parish Church of St Laurence stands to the east of the Market Place. Local tradition dates parts of it to the 11th century, possibly built under Viking King Cnut. However, some place the oldest parts of the church after the Norman Conquest, possibly in the 12th century. It was originally a daughter church of All Saints, Sawley, but gained separate status in the 19th century.

There are several fine examples of industrial architecture in Long Eaton. Most have to do with its development as a lace-making centre. By 1907, the town housed almost 1,400 lace machines and the industry employed over 4,000 people (a quarter of the population). One of the largest lace-making mills, Harrington Mill, was built in 1885. It took one and a quarter million bricks to build the 167-metre long factory and it has 224 cast-iron windows down one side. Harrington Mill is a traditional, four-storey, red lace mill, built by a consortium of manufacturers. The turrets on the sides house the original staircases.

The floors above the shops in High Street and the Market Place show that large parts of the centre were built in Victorian or early 20th-century times. The New Central Building is an example of late Victorian architecture. The High Street and Market Place were pedestrianised in the 1990s. The work to enhance the layout and paving of the town centre was completed in 2010.

Transport
The main road through the town forms part of the A6005. Junction 25 of the M1 motorway is on its north-western border. The area round the town-centre traffic island is locally called The Green.

Long Eaton railway station is on the Midland Main Line from London, St Pancras. The broad Erewash Canal passes through the town.

There are bus services every few minutes to the nearby cities of Nottingham and Derby. Other local destinations include the East Midlands Airport (8½ miles, 13.7 km).

Schools
Long Eaton has two state secondary schools, The Long Eaton School and Wilsthorpe School, and several primary schools, including Brooklands, St Lawrence, Dovedale, Sawley, Harrington, English Martyrs, Longmoor and Grange. It also contains the public school Trent College (founded 1868), the private Elms School for ages 3–11, and two special needs schools: Stanton Vale and Brackenfield SEND School.

Long Eaton School was split into two sites: Lower for years 7, 8 and 9, and Upper for years 10, 11 and sixth form. The Lower School building, opened in 1965, was demolished in 2006, when new school premises were built next door on the same grounds. Upper and Lower are now in one building again (with sixth Form being slightly apart), which was opened by Gordon Brown as Chancellor of the Exchequer. It has become an eco school with an eco club, and recently joined the Archway Trust. There is a research-grade telescope built on school grounds., where stargazing sessions have been open to the public in the past. It previously had partnership and student exchange relations with Spanish, French, Italian and Chinese schools.

In 2005 Wilsthorpe School gained specialist status in business and enterprise. In 2018, the school was rebuilt. Both Wilsthorpe and Long Eaton schools have an OFSTED rating of "good".

Brass band
Long Eaton Silver Prize brass band is one of only two still functioning in Erewash. It was formed in 1906 after severing from a local temperance society. At its height, it reached the Brass Band Second Section. The original club building in Sailsbury Street closed in early 2015, but the band itself plays on.

In 2006, its centenary year, the band won the Midland Area Regional Championships, its first contest win since 1966. This secured promotion back to the Second Section and an invitation to the National Championships of Great Britain. The band also won this contest, in what were its best contest results since 1927.

Sport
Long Eaton United F.C. plays in the Midland Football League, as founder members in 2014. The club was formed in 1956 but records show football prominent in the town for many years before. The Football Club has many junior sides and gained FA Charter Standard Community Club status in 2013. It also has a ladies' team competing in the East Midlands Womens Football League.

Long Eaton RFC is a Rugby Union club, established in 1969.

Long Eaton Swimming Club, one of Derbyshire's largest, arose in 2007, when the Trident and Treonte swimming clubs merged. It covers all levels, from learners to competitive senior and master swimmers. Its home pool is at West Park Leisure Centre.

Long Eaton Cricket Club, established in 1972, currently has three senior teams competing in the South Nottinghamshire Cricket League, two Sunday league teams in the Newark Club Cricket Alliance league and a junior training section that plays competitive cricket in the Erewash Young Cricketers League.

Sawley Cricket Club moved onto West Park from nearby Sawley park in 1977. It has four senior teams competing in the Derbyshire County Cricket League and a junior training section that plays competitively in the Erewash Young Cricketers League.

Long Eaton Park Croquet Club (LEPCC) was founded in 1980 and is located behind the West Park Leisure Centre. The club is a full member of the Croquet Association and is an active member of the Federation of East Midlands Croquet Clubs (FEMCC).

Long Eaton Speedway raced at the Long Eaton Stadium in Station Road. The first meet was held on 18 May 1929. The Long Eaton Invaders became National Speedway Champions in 1984. However, the speedway stadium closed in 1997 and its site is held by an estate of houses and flats and by a playing field for Grange Primary School.

Long Eaton Rangers F.C. was founded in 1889 but left the Midland League in 1899.

Recreation
The main park is West Park which has a café and neighbours West Park Leisure Centre. 
Long Eaton holds an annual "Chestnut Fair" in November.

In a tradition which started in 1931, the town hosts an annual Carnival each year – currently on the third Saturday in June. The event commences with a parade of floats, decorated vehicles and walkers in fancy dress, which circulates round the town. It continues in the afternoon and evening with a range of entertainment, stalls and a funfair on the Carnival showground on West Park.

Notable people
Albert Ball VC (1896–1917), fighter pilot, attended Trent College, Long Eaton, in 1911–1913.
Garry Birtles (born 1956), professional footballer, joined Nottingham Forest FC from Long Eaton United and won two European Cups.
Shaun Davis, bodybuilder, Mr Universe 1996.
Mark Draper (born 1970), professional footballer
Georgia Groome (born 1992), actress
Paula Christine Hammond MBE, JP (1944–2017), businesswoman
Ernest Terah Hooley (1859–1947), business financier, four-times bankrupt, died in reduced circumstances at Long Eaton.
Geoff Hoon (born 1953), Labour Party politician (Defence Secretary 1999–2006, Leader of House of Commons 2006–2007, Gov't Chief Whip 2008) attended Brooklands School.
Douglas Houghton, Baron Houghton of Sowerby (1898–1996), Labour politician, last surviving cabinet member born in the 19th century and serving in the First World War
Saira Khan (born 1970), TV presenter
Laura Knight (1877–1970), DBE, impressionist painter
Eric Malpass (1910–1996), novelist
Lewis McGugan (born 1988), professional footballer
Dougie Squires OBE (born 1932), choreographer
John Walters (1939–2001), radio broadcaster and musician
Bru-C (1991-present), Drum n Bass musician, philosopher

Twin towns
 Romorantin-Lanthenay,  France, since 1961
 Langen,  Germany

See also
List of places in Derbyshire
Listed buildings in Long Eaton

References

Gallery

External links

Erewash Borough Council

 
Towns in Derbyshire
Railway towns in England
Unparished areas in Derbyshire
Borough of Erewash